GMR Institute of Technology (GMRIT) is an engineering college in India. It is in the Rajam, Vizianagaram district of Andhra Pradesh. It is affiliated to Jawaharlal Nehru Technological University, Kakinada.

History 
GMRIT was established in 1997 by the GMR Varalakshmi Foundation — the corporate social responsibility arm of the GMR Group.

Dr. C.L.V.R.S.V. Prasad is principal of GMRIT.

Departments 
GMRIT offers a four-year Bachelors in Technology (B.Tech.) programme in eight disciplines. Students are admitted on the basis of merit in EAMCET.

Departments at GMRIT are: 
Chemical Engineering
Civil Engineering
Computer Science and Engineering
Electrical and Electronics Engineering
Electronics and Communications Engineering
Information Technology
Mechanical Engineering

GMRIT offers seven M.Tech. programmes in seven specialized areas of engineering. Students are admitted on the basis of merit scores of GATE/PGCET through common window of counseling for category 'A' seats or category 'B' seats.

M.Tech. program/courses are offered with the following specializations: 
Transportation Engineering
Computer science & Engineering
Digital Electronics & Communication Systems
VLSI Design — Second Shift
Power and Industrial Drives
Mechanical — CAD / CAM
Environmental Engineering

References

External links
Official website

Engineering colleges in Andhra Pradesh
Universities and colleges in Srikakulam district
Educational institutions established in 1997
1997 establishments in Andhra Pradesh
Uttarandhra